Nur al-Din Bimaristan is a large Muslim medieval bimaristan ("hospital") in Damascus, Syria. It is located in the al-Hariqa quarter in the old walled city, to the southwest of the Umayyad Mosque. It was built and named after the Zengid Sultan Nur ad-Din in 1154, and later on an extension was added to the main building in 1242 by a physician Badr al-Din. It was restored in 1975 and now houses the Museum of Medicine and Science in the Arab World.

Constructed in two phases the first construction phase was commissioned by Nur al-Din in 1154 CE and the second phase was about 90 years later and was commissioned by a physician, Badr al-Din, circa 1242 CE. It was renovated in 1975 and a small museum was established here.

See also

 Nur al-Din Madrasa

References

External links
Nur al-Din Bimaristan, at archnet.org

Buildings and structures inside the walled city of Damascus
Museums in Syria
Bimaristans
Medical museums
Science museums
Hospitals in Syria
Hospitals established in the 12th century
1154 establishments in Asia
Medieval Syria
Zengid architecture